Johannes Lützen Bouma (born 9 June 1934) is a Dutch economist. He was a professor of business home economics at the University of Groningen from 1966 to 1999.

Bouma was born in Twijzelerheide. In May 1966 he obtained his PhD at the University of Groningen with a dissertation titled: Ondernemingsdoel en winst : een confrontatie van enkele theorieën van het ondernemingsgedrag.

The role Bouma played as simultaneous member of the supervisory board of SNS Property Finance and one of its largest clients, the Burgfonds, was criticized after the bankruptcy of the Burgfonds.

Bouma was elected a member of the Royal Netherlands Academy of Arts and Sciences in 1976.

References

1934 births
Living people
Members of the Royal Netherlands Academy of Arts and Sciences
People from Achtkarspelen
University of Groningen alumni
Academic staff of the University of Groningen